Marylin Viridiana Díaz Ramírez (born November 18, 1991) is a Mexican footballer who plays as a defender for Cruz Azul in Mexico. She played for the Mexico women's national team.

Playing career

Club

UE L'Estartit
In early January 2011, Díaz joined then-Superliga team UE L'Estartit as a winter transfer. She was there only six months.

FC Kansas City (NWSL)
In January 2013, Diaz was included in a list of 55 players from the U.S., Canada, and Mexico national teams that were allocated to the eight teams in the new National Women's Soccer League. As part of the NWSL Player Allocation, she was allocated to FC Kansas City. In March 2013, the Mexican federation informed the club that Diaz would not be joining the team.

Real Celeste
As of January 2015, she was playing for Real Celeste in Mexican women's national league.

International

References

External links
 
 Marylin Diaz at FC Kansas City
 
 

1991 births
Living people
Footballers from Mexico City
Mexican women's footballers
Women's association football defenders
Women's association football midfielders
Primera División (women) players
UE L'Estartit players
Mexico women's international footballers
Pan American Games medalists in football
Mexican expatriate women's footballers
Mexican expatriate sportspeople in Spain
Expatriate women's footballers in Spain
Liga MX Femenil players
Club América (women) footballers
Pan American Games bronze medalists for Mexico
Footballers at the 2011 Pan American Games
Cruz Azul (women) footballers
Medalists at the 2011 Pan American Games
20th-century Mexican women
21st-century Mexican women
Mexican footballers